INS Puran is a self-propelled fuel carrier barge built by Modest Infrastructure Ltd in Bhavnagar, Gujarat, for the Indian Navy.

Description
The auxiliary ship has a capacity to carry 500 tonnes of fuel. Purak has sea going capabilities and all of the essential communication and navigation equipment. The wheel house is air conditioned and the vessel is classed under IRS (No:40634) with class notation : +SUL + IY, for carriage of oil with flash point above 60 degree.

Puran is part of a series of five barges being built by the Modest Infrastructure Limited.

See also

Arga Class Tugboat

External links
 Specifications
 Modest Infrastructure Ltd.

Auxiliary ships of the Indian Navy